Paromoeocerus notabilis is a species of beetle in the family Cerambycidae. It was described by Melzer in 1918.

References

Unxiini
Beetles described in 1918